War is Hell is a 1961 American war film written, produced and directed by Burt Topper. The film stars Baynes Barron and Michael Bell and is narrated by Audie Murphy. A featured cast member is Judy Dan.

Plot 

Set during the Korean War, the film depicts the atrocities of battle. Sgt. Garth (Barron), a bloodthirsty egomaniac, neglects to tell his soldiers that there has been a cease fire. The sergeant sends his unit into an enemy bunker, where they are fiercely attacked by the enemy. The few who survive secure the bunker, and Garth attempts to take credit for their actions. Further chaos ensues, resulting in the deaths of many in the platoon, as well as a mortal wound to the sergeant.

Cast

Release 
United Artists released the second James Bond film, From Russia with Love, with War Is Hell as the second feature of a double bill in the United States on May 27, 1964.

In popular culture
War Is Hell and the 1963 film Cry of Battle were playing as a double feature at the Texas Theatre in Dallas, Texas on November 22, 1963. After fatally shooting President John F. Kennedy and Dallas police officer J. D. Tippit earlier that afternoon, Lee Harvey Oswald sneaked into the theater without paying while War Is Hell was on the screen. After box office cashier Julia Postal was informed by shoe store employee John Brewer that a man had entered the theater, she called Dallas police. Despite attempting to shoot the arresting officer, Oswald was arrested. Oswald was fatally shot two days later by club owner Jack Ruby while being transferred to another jail.

Coincidentally, lead actor Baynes Barron was born on May 29, 1917, the same day on which Kennedy was born.

Notes

External links

 

1961 films
1961 war films
Allied Artists films
American war films
Audie Murphy
American black-and-white films
Films set in the 1950s
American independent films
Korean War films
Films directed by Burt Topper
Films produced by Burt Topper
Films scored by Ronald Stein
1960s English-language films
1960s American films
Films set in bunkers